Salvia alba is an annual or perennial herb that is native to southern Bolivia and northern Argentina, growing in the Tucuman-Bolivian forest belt in disturbed areas of semi-shaded moist woodland. In modern times it has been seen growing at  elevation, though there are records of a wider range of growth.

The  corolla is pure white.

Notes

alba
Flora of Bolivia
Plants described in 2007